Acmaeops septentrionis is a species of the Lepturinae subfamily in the long-horned beetle family. This beetle is distributed in Austria, Belarus, Bulgaria, Czech Republic, Estonia, Finland, France, Germany, China, Italy, Japan, Latvia, Lithuania, Mongolia, North Korea, Norway, Poland, South Korea, Romania, Russia, Slovakia, Slovenia, Sweden, Switzerland, and Ukraine. Adult beetle feeds on Norway spruce.

Subtaxa
There are two varieties in Acmaeops septentrionis species:
 Acmaeops septentrionis var. alpestris Pic, 1898
 Acmaeops septentrionis var. simplonica (Stierlin, 1880)

References

Lepturinae